Philippine American Women Writers and Artists also known as PAWWA was founded in 1991 by a group of seven Filipina writers in Southern California. It was the first such support group for Filipina women writers. Aside from supporting one another, the group wanted to help other Filipina writers and artists, as well as to provide community service. PAWWA encouraged the creation of PAWWA-North, headed by Ceres Alabado in the Bay Area, California.

PAWWA's founding members are: Valorie Slaughter Bejarano, Cecilia Manguerra Brainard, Mariquita Athena Davison, Fe Panalingan Koons, Susan N. Montepio, Cecile Caguingin Ochoa, and Nentuzka C. Villamar.

For six years, PAWWA received the highly competitive Multicultural Entry Grant from the California Arts Council (CAC). PAWWA used that funding to help publish a newsletter and books: Seven Stories from Seven Sisters: A Collection of Philippine Folktales (1992); The Beginning and Other Asian Folktales (1995);A Directory of Philippine American Women Writers and Artists; and Journey of 100 Years: Reflections on the Centennial of Philippine Independence (1999).

On April 14, 1998, PAWWA and the Asian Pacific Student Services of Loyola Marymount University held a one-day conference entitled "Journey of 100 Years."  Presenters were : Cecilia Manguerra Brainard, Maria Luisa Carino (or Maria Luisa Igloria), Rosita Galang, Paulino Lim Jr., Edmundo Litton, Herminia Menez, Susan Montepio, and Nadine Sarreal.  An offshoot of that conference was the book, Journey of 100 Years.

When PAWWA's CAC funding ran out in June 1998, the remaining members of PAWWA decided to move on, and PAWWA was dissolved.

Books published by PAWWA
Seven Stories From Seven Sisters: A Collection of Philippines Folktales, PAWWA, 1992
The Beginning and Other Asian Folktales PAWWA, 1995
A Directory of Philippine American Women Writers and Artists
Journey of 100 Years: Reflections on the Centennial of Philippine Independence, PAWWA, 1999
Asian and Philippine Folktales: Retellings by PAWWA, PALH, 2022

See also
:Category:Filipino women writers
:Category:Filipino women artists

References

External links
Amerasia Journal review of Journey of 100 Years by Roger Bresnahan
"PAWWA Pictures & Memorabilia"

PAWWA
PAWWA
PAWWA
PAWWA
PAWWA
PAWWA
American writers' organizations

Asian-American women's organizations
Women in California
Filipino-American history
Filipino-American culture in California
1991 establishments in California
American women artists